Hot Country Songs is a chart that ranks the top-performing country music songs in the United States, published by Billboard magazine.  In 1979, 33 different singles topped the chart, which was published at the time under the title Hot Country Singles, in 52 issues of the magazine.  Chart placings were based on playlists submitted by country music radio stations and sales reports submitted by stores.

Waylon Jennings, Anne Murray, Kenny Rogers, and Conway Twitty tied for the highest total number of weeks spent at number one in 1979, each spending five weeks at the top of the chart.  Jennings, Murray and Twitty each had a run of three consecutive weeks at number one with "Amanda", "I Just Fall in Love Again" and "Happy Birthday Darlin'" respectively.  The three songs tied for the longest unbroken run in the top spot during 1979 with "Every Which Way but Loose" by Eddie Rabbitt, "Golden Tears" by Dave & Sugar and "If I Said You Had a Beautiful Body Would You Hold It Against Me" by the Bellamy Brothers, each of which also spent three weeks atop the listing.  Murray, Rogers and Twitty each had three number ones in 1979, the most by an individual act.

In January, John Conlee achieved the first of seven number one country singles with "Lady Lay Down"; he would reach number one for the second time in May.  Two weeks after Conlee's second number one, the Bellamy Brothers topped the chart for the first time.  The brother duo had topped Billboards all-genres singles chart, the Hot 100, three years earlier with "Let Your Love Flow", but had not previously topped the country listing until the 1979 success of "If I Said You Had a Beautiful Body Would You Hold It Against Me".   In August, the Charlie Daniels Band reached number one for the first and only time with "The Devil Went Down to Georgia".  The following month Leon Russell made his first appearance at the top of the country chart when he collaborated with Willie Nelson on a cover version of Elvis Presley's 1950s song "Heartbreak Hotel".  This was Russell's first song to appear on the country singles chart under the name which he used for the majority of his recording career, although he had previously entered the lower reaches of the chart with two songs released under the alter ego Hank Wilson.  The final artist to top the Hot Country chart for the first time in 1979 was Moe Bandy, who achieved his first chart-topper in September when he collaborated with Joe Stampley on the novelty single "Just Good Ol' Boys", before going on to gain a solo number one with "I Cheated Me Right Out of You" in December.

Chart history

See also
1979 in music
List of artists who reached number one on the U.S. country chart

References

1979
1979 record charts
Country